Újezd is a very common Czech toponym roughly meaning around-ridden. It denotes a settlement newly established in the Middle Ages (usually in woody, previously sparsely populated areas of the country). The boundaries of such portion of land were set by riding on horseback around the location.

Municipalities

Újezd (Beroun District)
Újezd (Domažlice District)
Újezd (Olomouc District)
Újezd (Žďár nad Sázavou District)
Újezd (Zlín District)
Újezd (Znojmo District)
Újezd nade Mží
Újezd pod Troskami
Újezd u Boskovic
Újezd u Brna
Újezd u Černé Hory
Újezd u Chocně
Újezd u Plánice
Újezd u Přelouče
Újezd u Rosic
Újezd u Sezemic
Újezd u Svatého Kříže
Újezd u Tišnova
Bílý Újezd
Červený Újezd (Benešov District)
Červený Újezd (Prague-West District)
Chodský Újezd
Dlouhý Újezd
Dolní Újezd (Přerov District)
Dolní Újezd (Svitavy District)
Drahoňův Újezd
Horní Újezd (Přerov District)
Horní Újezd (Svitavy District)
Horní Újezd (Třebíč District)
Hřivínův Újezd
Kamenný Újezd (České Budějovice District)
Kamenný Újezd (Rokycany District)
Malý Újezd
Medový Újezd
Ostrolovský Újezd
Panoší Újezd
Pletený Újezd
Podhorní Újezd a Vojice
Svatojanský Újezd
Svijanský Újezd
Velký Újezd
Vysoký Újezd (Benešov District)
Vysoký Újezd (Beroun District) 
Vysoký Újezd (Hradec Králové District)

See also
Újezdec (disambiguation), a toponym of the same origin
Uyezd, a Russian administrative subdivision